Gregor Schoeler, born in Germany in 1944,  is a contemporary non-Muslim Islamic scholar He has served the chair of Islamic studies at the University of Basel since 2009. Prior to that, he served in a professorship role in the same field at Paris-Sorbonne University starting from 1982 and has lectured at the School for Advanced Studies in the Social Sciences since 2000.

He majored in Islamic studies and Semitic languages at the University of Marburg, Goethe University Frankfurt and University of Giessen.

His most well known work is the collected series of lectures known as Écrire et transmettre dans les débuts de l'islam, which is available in French, English and Arabic. In March 2010, Schoeler delivered a series of lectures on Islamic oral and written tradition at the Cornell University College of Arts and Sciences.

Works

 The Biography of Muhammad: Nature and Authenticity, trns. Uwe Vagelpohl, ed. and intr. James E. Montgomery. London: Routledge, 2011. 200 pgs. 
 The Oral and the Written in Early Islam, trns. Uwe Vagelpohl, ed. and intr. James E. Montgomery. London: Routledge, 2006. 248 pgs.

References

External links
 Prof. em. Dr. Gregor Schoeler University of Basel

Living people
German Islamic studies scholars
German male writers
1944 births